Cyprinion tenuiradius is a species of ray-finned fish in the genus Cyprinion.

Footnotes 

 

tenuiradius
Fish described in 1847